Shiprock High School is a public high school in Shiprock, New Mexico (USA). Shiprock High is part of the Central Consolidated School District along with Kirtland Central High School and Newcomb High School.  The school colors are Crimson, Silver, and Turquoise and the mascot is the Chieftain.

Facilities

Performing arts center

Phil L. Thomas Performing Arts Center, is a performance space that is intended for use by various types of the performing arts, including dance, music, theatre and concerts. The school has been the host site for the Navajo Times All-Star banquet, honoring local athletes in both New Mexico and Arizona.

Performers
A list of performers who have visited and performed at Shiprock High School:

Athletic facilities
Shiprock High School's largest sports facility, Chieftain Stadium is used for football games, track and field meets and can be used for soccer games, the Chieftain Pit :(basketball and volleyball), and the Natatorium (swimming). There are also a baseball, and softball fields, a 4-court tennis complex, a cross country course, a weight room, and basketball courts.  The Navajo Nation and Shiprock High School hosted the 2011 Native Vision : Sports Camp on June 5–7.  It involved 62 professional and collegiate athletes volunteered to coach, Approximately 800 youth from over 15 tribal nations attended. Six sports clinics were offered, including football, basketball, volleyball, soccer, track and lacrosse.

Athletics and activities
The basketball game area, which has a capacity of 4,000 spectators, is called the "pit". A 1999 article by the Gallup Independent states that girls' basketball games at the varsity level often have all spectator seats sold.
 
The Chieftains have won 16 NMAA state championships in Chieftains and Lady Chieftain sports, they have claimed numerous district 1-AAA and 1-AAAA titles.

Shiprock High School is a member of the New Mexico Activities Association (NMAA) Class AAAA schools in District 1-AAAA.

District 1-AAAA, Shiprock High School, Thoreau High School, Wingate High School, Navajo Prep :

Chieftain Athletics
Shiprock High School participates in the following athletics : 

Chieftains
Baseball :
Basketball :
Cross Country :
Football :
Golf :
Track & Field
Wrestling :

Lady Chieftains
Basketball :
Cross Country :
Golf :
Softball :
Track & Field
Volleyball :

Chieftain rankings
Chieftain Basketball Rankings :
Lady Chieftain Basketball Rankings :
NM Track & XC Coaches Association Top Ten Polls :

State championships

The Shiprock Lady Chieftains basketball program won the 2017 AAAA New Mexico State Girls Basketball Championship, its sixth overall New Mexico State title. This followed crowns in 1988, 1989, 1990, 1992, and 2002.  The Shiprock JROTC program won its second consecutive state title in 2018 and this adds to the overall 16th state team title to all Shiprock High School athletics. Shiprock High School has numerous District 1-AAA and 1-AAAA district titles and numerous individual state champions. The Shiprock Lady Chieftains have a combined record of 6-8 in New Mexico State Championship games.

State Championships

State Championship Scoreboard

State Runner-up

Individual State Champions

District Championships

Shiprock High School national mention

Rocks With Wings, Documentary, USA Today :
Rocks With Wings, Documentary, New York Times :
Rocks With Wings, Documentary, Montreal Mirror, :
Native Vision, Johns Hopkins :

References

Public high schools in New Mexico
Schools in San Juan County, New Mexico
Education on the Navajo Nation